The Mazur Commission (sometimes known as the Mazur-Wasilewski Commission) was a commission appointed in the Polish People's Republic in 1956 to investigate cases of unlawful conduct in Polish military courts, the counter-espionage Military Information Directorate, Chief Military Prosecutor Office, and Poland's Highest Military Court during the Stalinist period in Poland (1948–1954). The commission was also charged with examining the role of specific agents and officers of these institutions. The commission did not investigate the work done by regional military courts and the thousands of cases of civilians sentences by these courts.

The commission was named after Marian Mazur, the initial director of the commission, who, after being appointed Public Prosecutor General of Poland, was replaced on March 18, 1957, by Jan Wasilewski.

References

Polish People's Republic
1956 in Poland